Akkent is a village of Malatya Province, Turkey on the Euphrates River located at .

On 24 January 2020 the town was impacted by a magnitude 6.7 earthquake.

References 

Western Armenia
Villages in Malatya Province